The East Lancs Spryte was a low floor single-decker bus body built by East Lancashire Coachbuilders. It was designed to body the Dennis Dart SLF chassis, but a handful have been built on others, for example, the Volvo B6LE. Mechanically and visually, it is the single-decker version of the East Lancs Lolyne.

It has a double-curvature windscreen with a separately mounted destination display and an arched top with a rounded roof dome similar to the Flyte as commonly seen on these buses in the United Kingdom. Like the Lolyne, it continued the line of deliberately misspelt names of East Lancs products. But unlike the Lolyne, which survived through the Myllennium-series as the Myllennium Lolyne, the Spryte did not. Instead, it was replaced by the single-decker Myllennium, sometimes called by its unofficial name, the Myllennium Spryte.

See also

 List of buses

References

External links

East Lancs Spryte/Flyte images on Flickr

Spryte
Buses of the United Kingdom
Midibuses
Low-floor buses
Low-entry buses
Single-deck buses